Noken is a traditional Indonesian multifunctional knotted or woven bag native to the Western New Guinea region, Indonesia. Its distinctive usage, which involves being hung from the head, is traditionally used to carry various goods, and also children.

In 2012, noken was listed in the UNESCO Intangible Cultural Heritage Lists as a cultural heritage of Indonesia. Women carrying noken are still a common sight in Wamena.

In several areas of Central Papua and Highland Papua, noken – instead of the usual ballot box – is preferred as a way to place ballots, where it is recognized as a ballot tool and system where Big man (primarily the chieftains) cast vote for the tribe or noken gantung, where the tribe members and the chief collectively decide to vote unanimously in the regional leadership elections. Opponents to the system has challenged the use of noken as fraught with potential for abuse and have challenged it in Constitutional Court of Indonesia, although the court defended the limited use of noken for avoiding inter-tribal warfare, and regencies that have used One man, one vote system cannot return to noken system.

On December 4, 2020, Google celebrated noken with a Google Doodle.

Gallery

See also

 Indonesian art
 Culture of Indonesia

References

Intangible Cultural Heritage in Need of Urgent Safeguarding
Masterpieces of the Oral and Intangible Heritage of Humanity
Indonesian culture
Papua (province) culture
Indonesian words and phrases
Bags
Papua New Guinean culture
Crochet